Purpura, purple in Latin, may refer to:

 Purpura, red or purple discolorations on the skin which do not blanch under pressure
 Purpura (gastropod), a genus of sea snails which can be used to produce a purple dye
 Purpura, an Anglo-Saxon textile term which may describe shot silk

People
 Anthony Purpura (born 1986), American rugby union player
 Lia Purpura, American poet, writer and educator
 Michael Purpura, American attorney
 Tim Purpura, General Manager of the Houston Astros Major League Baseball team

See also
 Purpurea (disambiguation)
 Purpureum (disambiguation)